Staroselye may refer to:
Staroselye (rural locality), name of several rural localities in Russia
Staroselye Airport, an airport near Rybinsk, Yaroslavl Oblast, Russia

See also
Strashelye (Hasidic dynasty), a branch of the Chabad school of Hasidic Judaism